Powell Basin is an undersea basin named for George Powell, captain of a British sealing ship, who discovered Powell Island. Name approved 10/77 (ACUF 177).

Oceanic basins of the Southern Ocean